CSOB can refer to:
 Československá obchodní banka, large Czech bank
 Český svaz orientačního běhu, orienteering association
 Commission scolaire de l'Or-et-des-Bois, francophone school district in Quebec, Canada